Joy Beune (born 28 April 1999) is a Dutch allround speed skater who is specialized in the middle distances.

Career
Beune won the silver medal at the 2017 World Junior Speed Skating Championships in Warsaw. The following year, at the 2018 World Junior Speed Skating Championships in Utah, she became junior world champion. She won the 1000 m, 1500 m and 3000 m events and set world junior records at these distances.

In 2018 she became a member of Team LottoNL-Jumbo, signing a contract for two years.

Records

Personal records

 

At the end of the 2023 speed skating season, Beune occupied the 12th position on the Adelskalender with a score of 157.598 points

World records established

Tournament overview

Source:

World Cup overview

References

External links
 
 
 
 Team LottoNL-Jumbo profile
 

1999 births
Living people
Dutch female speed skaters
People from Borne, Overijssel
World Single Distances Speed Skating Championships medalists
21st-century Dutch women
Sportspeople from Overijssel